The 2014 New Brunswick Scotties Tournament of Hearts, the provincial women's curling championship for New Brunswick, was held from January 8 to 12 at the Thistle St. Andrews Curling Club in Saint John. The winning team of Andrea Crawford represented New Brunswick at the 2014 Scotties Tournament of Hearts in Montreal.

Teams

Round-robin standings
Final round-robin standings

Crawford received first place and a bye to the final by virtue of having the best last shot draw average through the round-robin.

Round-robin results

Draw 1
Thursday, January 9, 2:00 pm

Draw 2
Thursday, January 9, 7:00 pm

Draw 3
Friday, January 10, 2:00 pm

Draw 4
Friday, January 10, 7:00 pm

Draw 5
Saturday, January 11, 8:00 am

Playoffs

Semifinal
Saturday, January 11, 7:00 pm

Final
Sunday, January 11, 11:00 am

External links
Results

Curling competitions in Saint John, New Brunswick
New Brunswick
New Brunswick Scotties Tournament of Hearts
2014 in New Brunswick